Jimwell Torion (born March 13, 1973) is a former Filipino professional basketball player in the PBA from 2000 to 2007.

Career
After his college career with Salazar Institute of Technology in Cebu City, Torion was brought in by Photokina Marketing when it joined the amateur Philippine Basketball League (PBL) as Agfa Color (and later Red Bull). When Red Bull joined the Philippine Basketball Association (PBA) in the 2000 season, the team brought Torion in to PBA directly from the amateur PBL, along with Kerby Raymundo, Lordy Tugade, Junthy Valenzuela, Davonn Harp, and Bernard Tanpua.  He became the starting point guard for the team, until Willie Miller came along.

His career was notable for the numerous fines and suspensions he had because of various violations, and in 2003, he was suspended indefinitely (later reduced to eight months) by then PBA Commissioner Noli Eala after he was tested positive for an illegal substance in a random test.  The suspension was later lifted after he completed the rehab program.

References

1973 births
Living people
Filipino men's basketball players
Barako Bull Energy players
Barako Bull Energy Boosters players
Basketball players from Cebu
Cebuano people
Doping cases in basketball
Philippine Basketball Association All-Stars
Point guards
Salazar Tech Skyblazers basketball players
Sportspeople from Cebu City
Sta. Lucia Realtors players